Playlist: The Very Best of Suicidal Tendencies is a 2010 best-of compilation album released on Sony Legacy, featuring a collection of Suicidal Tendencies' music with the label (as such, material from their first two albums and post-1993 releases are not included).

Background
Playlist was reportedly released without Suicidal Tendencies' involvement (they were no longer associated with Epic Records at the time of its release), so it is unlikely that the compilation is officially recognized by the band themselves. It was also not listed on the discography page from their official website (as of October 2015, the website no longer covers the band's entire discography).

Like the first Suicidal Tendencies compilation album Prime Cuts, Playlist covers only the band's major label years, and omits anything before 1988; two of the songs included on this compilation, "War Inside My Head" and "Institutionalized", are the re-recorded versions from Still Cyco After All These Years. The compilation album also omits anything from the band's 1994 album Suicidal for Life, although it was released on Epic.

The album was released on January 26, 2010 as part of the Playlist music album series issued by Legacy Recordings, simultaneously with similarly unsanctioned best-of collections of the bands and solo artists Mariah Carey, Blue Öyster Cult, Joe Satriani, Steve Vai, 311, R. Kelly, KRS-One and the Backstreet Boys.

Track listing

References 

Suicidal Tendencies albums
Suicidal Tendencies
2010 compilation albums